Ayers Kaserne at Kirch-Göns, Germany (coordinates: 50° 28' 46.08" N  8° 38' 41.83" E) was a U.S. Army installation built in 1952 as part of the major construction efforts under the U.S. Army troop augmentation program of the early 1950s, occupied by the 22nd Regimental Combat Team of the Fourth infantry Division until May, 1956, and by the Third U.S. Armored Division in 1956 and then home to Combat Command A, 3rd Armored Division was stationed at Ayers Kaserne beginning 12 May 1956. The troops arrived following an 11-hour train ride from the port of Bremerhaven.

History
As of 1 October 1963, Combat Command A was reorganized and re-designated as the 1st Brigade,3rd Armored Division (United States) which was the largest combat brigade in Europe until 1996 when the division colors were transferred back to Ft. Knox, Kentucky for retirement of the colors, thus the end of the historic 3rd Armored Division (United States) (Spearhead). 

The installation was known throughout the United States European Command (EUCOM) as "the Rock".

Originally, Ayers Kaserne was used as a recovery field for the German Luftwaffe during World War II. The entire base was demolished, except for one bunker.

United States President and Commander-In-Chief Gerald R. Ford visited Ayers Kaserne in July 1975; the first visit by a U.S. President to a U.S. military installation in Europe since John F. Kennedy's 1963 visit to the 3rd Armored division in Hanau, Germany. President Ford was accompanied by General Alexander M. Haig, Jr. (the seventh Supreme Allied Commander, Europe), Colonel Louis C. Wagner, Jr. (Commander, 1st Brigade, 3AD); and Georg Leber (German Minister of Defense).

Units of the 1st Armored Division (forward) occupied the kaserne until its closing and return to the German government in 1998.

Today, the former military kaserne has been redeveloped as a business/industrial park, chiefly occupied by a transport company named "Bork". All post buildings have been demolished except for the former chapel.

The kaserne was named Ayers Kaserne in honor of SSG Lovall E. Ayers, B Company, 22nd Infantry Regiment, 4th Infantry Division, killed in action in World War II.

See also

Kaserne
List of United States Army installations in Germany

References

External links
  
  
  
 

Ayers
Military installations closed in the 1990s